Edo society refers to the society of Japan under the rule of the Tokugawa Shogunate during the Edo period from 1603 to 1868.

Edo society was a feudal society with strict social stratification, customs, and regulations intended to promote political stability. Japanese people were assigned into a hierarchy of social classes based on the Four Occupations that were hereditary.

The majority of Edo society were commoners divided into peasant, craftsmen, and merchant classes, and various "untouchable" groups.

The  from 1853 on led to growing opposition to the Edo system and it was dismantled after the Meiji Restoration in 1868.

Historic context
Feudalism, social stratification, and explicit fine-grained ranking of people existed in Japan long before the Edo period, beginning with attempts as far back as the Taika Reforms in 645 AD, initiating the  legal system that was modeled from Chinese Tang dynasty legal code. The reforms were following a major and devastating coup d'etat attempt by Soga no Emishi, with the events not only exterminating entire clans, but tearing apart a gaping hole in the Japanese indigenous religion, Ko-Shintō, paving the way for a Buddhist-Shinto syncretism of religion.

The Taika Reforms were the "legal glue" deemed necessary to thwart future coup d'etat attempts, and the  system led to the formation of castes in Japan. Nevertheless, frequent warfare and political instability plagued Japan in following centuries, providing countless opportunities to usurp, bend, and mobilize positions within social ranks. Even the ranks themselves, especially military ranks, became more respected if only out of necessity. Confucian ideas from China also provided the foundation for a system of strict social prescriptions, along with political twists and turns of the day.

The Ashikaga Shogunate established a loose class system when it ruled Japan as a feudal shogunate during the Muromachi period from 1338 to 1573. The final collapse of the Ashikaga worsened the effects of the Sengoku period (or "Age of Warring States"), the state of social upheaval and near-constant civil war in Japan since 1467. Tokugawa Ieyasu of the Tokugawa clan and his Eastern Army emerged victorious after the Battle of Sekigahara in 1600, defeating the Western Army of Toyotomi Hideyori, ending the Sengoku civil wars.

The Tokugawa clan sought to eradicate any potential opposition across Japanese society from top-to-bottom to consolidate their rule.

Tokugawa class system
The Tokugawa introduced a system of strict social stratification, organizing the majority of Japan's social structure into a hierarchy of social classes. Japanese people were assigned a hereditary class based on their profession, which would be directly inherited by their children, and these classes were themselves stratified with their own hierarchies.

Aristocracy

Emperor
The Emperor of Japan was the official ruler of Japan at the very top of the Tokugawa class hierarchy. However, the Emperor was only a de jure ruler, functioning as a figurehead held up as the ultimate source of political sanction for the 's authority. The Emperor and his Imperial Court located in Kyoto, the official capital of Japan, were given virtually no political power but their prestige was invincible.

Court nobility

The  was the de facto ruler of Japan and third on the Tokugawa class hierarchy. The  was a hereditary position held by members of the Tokugawa clan who were direct descendants of Tokugawa Ieyasu.

The  were samurai feudal lords and fourth on the Tokugawa class hierarchy. A  was determined if a samurai's domain was assessed at 10,000  (50,000 bushels) or more under the Tokugawa  system of taxation.

The  held significant autonomy but the Tokugawa policy of  required them to alternate living in Edo and their domain every year.

Four classes

The Tokugawa government intentionally created a social order called the Four divisions of society that would stabilize the country. The new four classes were based on ideas of Confucianism that spread to Japan from China, and were not arranged by wealth or capital but by what philosophers described as their moral purity.

Samurai were placed at the top of society because they started an order and set a high moral example for others to follow. The system was meant to reinforce their position of power in society by justifying their ruling status. However, the  does not accurately describe Tokugawa society as Buddhist and Shinto priests, the  outside of the Imperial Court, and outcast classes were not included in this description of hierarchy.

In some cases, a poor samurai could be little better off than a peasant and the lines between the classes could blur, especially between artisans and merchants in urban areas. Still, the theory provided grounds for restricting privileges and responsibilities to different classes and it gave a sense of order to society. In practice, solidified social relationships in general helped create the political stability that defined the Edo period.

Samurai
Samurai were the noble [warrior] class in Japan and fifth on the Tokugawa class hierarchy. The samurai constituted about 10% of the population and functioned as soldiers in the employment of a lord in a master-warrior feudal relationship. However, their services were in limited demand as the Edo period was largely free from both external threats and internal conflicts.

Instead, the samurai maintained their fighting skills more as an art form than to fight. Samurai were paid a stipend from their lord, limiting their ties to the economic base. In addition, samurai could not own land, which would have given them income independent from their duty. Samurai generally lived around their 's castle, creating a thriving town or city environment around the middle of a domain.

There were social stratifications within the samurai class: upper-level samurai had direct access to their  and could hold his most trusted positions, with some achieving a level of wealth that allowed them to retain their own samurai vassals. Mid-level samurai held military and bureaucratic positions, and had some interactions with their  if needed. Low-level samurai could be paid as little as a subsistence wage and worked as guards, messengers and clerks.

Positions within the samurai class were largely hereditary and talented individuals could not rise above a few social steps beyond their birth.

Peasants 
Peasants were sixth on the Tokugawa class hierarchy and first of the commoner classes.

Peasants were held in high regard as commoners by the Tokugawa because they produced the most important commodity, food. According to Confucian philosophy, society could not survive without agriculture. Life for rural peasants focused on farming in and around their villages. Peasants rarely moved beyond their villages, and journeys and pilgrimages required a permit, but young people occasionally sought seasonal employment outside of their village. As a result, people were highly suspicious of outsiders. Social bonding, critical to the survival of the whole village, was also reinforced through seasonal festivals. Villages were highly collective; there were strong pressures to conform and no room to deviate from custom. Though there were conflicts, they were seen as disruptive to the village and order and were to be limited as much as possible.

The peasant class owned land, but rights to tax this land were given to the local . Peasants worked to produce enough food for themselves and still meet the tax burden. Most agriculture during this time was cultivated by families on their own land in contrast to the plantation or hacienda model implemented elsewhere. Peasants could amass relatively large amounts of wealth but remained in the same class because of their association with the land. Wealthier families and those that held their own land and paid taxes were held in much higher regard and had more political influence in village matters. However, the survival of the village depended on every household cooperating to meet the tax burden and overcome natural disasters such as famines. During the reign of the third , Tokugawa Iemitsu, farmers were not allowed to eat any of the rice they grew. They had to hand it all over to their  and then wait for him to give some back as charity.

Artisans

Artisans were seventh on the Tokugawa class hierarchy and second of the commoner classes.

Artisans were placed below the peasants because they were producers but they produced non-essential goods. Artisans typically lived in urban areas, and by 1800, as much as 10% of the population of Japan may have lived in large urban areas, one of the highest levels in the world at the time. The  and their samurai did not produce any goods themselves, but they used the tax surplus from the land to fuel their consumption. Their needs were met by artisans, who moved to be around the castles and were restricted to living in their own quarter.

Merchants

Merchants were eighth on the Tokugawa class hierarchy and third of the commoner classes.

Merchants were placed at the very bottom of the official system because they did not produce any goods, and due to their low status, were forced to hustle trading local and regional goods. Merchants, similar to artisans, typically lived in cities within their own quarter. Merchants grew increasingly powerful during the Edo period, in spite of their social standing, and the top merchants commanded a certain amount of respect, with Osaka and later Edo having concentrations of the merchant class.

Wealthy merchant houses arose to organize distributors and hold legal monopolies. As their wealth grew, merchants wanted to consume and display their wealth in the same manner as the samurai, but laws prevented them from doing so overtly. Still, their consumption combined with that of the samurai served to reinforce the growth of the merchant and artisan classes.

Untouchables
Underneath the merchant class were various communities and levels of outcasts not included within the official Tokugawa class system. These people were "untouchables" who fell outside of mainstream Japanese society for one reason or another, and were actively discriminated against at the societal level.

The  ( or ) were ethnic Japanese people whose occupations were considered impure or tainted by death, such as executioners, undertakers, slaughterhouse workers, butchers, and tanners. These occupations were seen to be  in the Shinto religion. In the Edo period, the social stigma of being a  developed into a hereditary status.

Ethnic minorities
The Tokugawa isolationist policy of  banned most foreigners from entering Japan.

Role of women
A Japanese woman's life varied immensely according to her family's social status. Women in samurai families were expected to submit to their male heads of household, but as they aged, they could become the ranking household member if their husband died. Children were enjoined to respect both of their parents, even as adults. Women from the lower classes were much less restricted by social expectations and could play an integral part in the family's business. Peasant women were expected to do household chores in the early morning before working in the fields with their male relatives and, regardless of age, were important, working members of their families.

Marriage was not based on romantic attraction. Families tried to use marriage as a way to increase their social standing or, among wealthier groups, to increase one's influence and holdings. Most often, however, marriage occurred between two families of equal status. Female virginity at marriage was important in the samurai classes; it was much less important to the lower classes. After marriage, women were restricted from taking additional sexual partners. Males of the upper classes, however, were able to take concubines and have relations with unmarried women. Divorce was common, and a woman from a poor household could very easily leave her husband and return to her original family.

Decline
The foundation of Edo society was its stable social order, but changes to Japanese society over the next two centuries began to challenge the Tokugawa system. Increasing urbanization and rising consumerism saw wealth become concentrated outside of the samurai class, and their fixed stipends did not increase despite the rising cost of commodities. The increasingly burdensome cost of proper social etiquette led many samurai to become indebted to wealthy urban merchant families. The merchants, in turn, were restricted from showing their wealth for fear of violating the laws that restricted privileges to the samurai class. That created deepening resentment but also increasing interdependence between the two classes.

Some Japanese scholars began to question the Confucian beliefs that provided the foundation of Edo society. Additionally, numerous changes in rural areas increasingly challenged the Tokugawa system. New technology which increased productivity allowed some peasant families to produce a surplus of food, creating a disposable income that could be used to support ventures beyond farming. Some peasants also became indebted to their wealthier neighbors, and more families lost ownership of their land. This sparked resentment that sometimes erupted into violence towards landlords and the village elite.

In 1853, the beginning of the  saw Edo society increasingly questioned by Japanese people when Western powers used their technological superiority to force concessions from the Tokugawa in the Unequal treaties. Many Japanese people, including members of the samurai, began to blame the Tokugawa for Japan's "backwardness" and subsequent humiliation. A modernization movement which advocated the abolition of feudalism and return of power to the Imperial Court eventually overthrew the Tokugawa Shogunate in the Meiji Restoration in 1868.

The new Meiji government of the Empire of Japan soon abolished the Tokugawa class system that characterized Edo society. The  and  classes were merged into the  aristocratic class with class privileges which formed the Meiji oligarchy.

References

Edo period